Abul Hasnat ( – 11 June 2019) was an Indian physician and politician. He was elected as MLA of Magrahat Paschim Vidhan Sabha Constituency in West Bengal Legislative Assembly in 2006. He also contested from Diamond Harbour in 2014, but lost to Abhishek Banerjee of All India Trinamool Congress.

Biography
Hasnat received MBBS degree under University of Calcutta in 1976 and received MS degree from Patna University in 1981. He was elected as a member of the West Bengal Legislative Assembly from Magrahat Paschim in 2006.

Hasnat died on 11 June 2019 at the age of 64.

References

1950s births
2019 deaths
Communist Party of India (Marxist) politicians
West Bengal MLAs 2006–2011
Medical doctors from West Bengal
University of Calcutta alumni
Patna University alumni
People from South 24 Parganas district